Buena Vista Charter Township is a charter township of Saginaw County in the U.S. state of Michigan. Per the 2020 census, the population was 7,664.

History
This area was known to the Ojibwe as Tik-wak-baw-hawning.

On July 30, 2013, the Saginaw Intermediate School District Board of Trustees officially dissolved Buena Vista School District with its area split up between three other districts: Bridgeport-Spaulding Community School District (135 students), Saginaw City School District (260) or Frankenmuth School District.

Communities
Buena Vista is a census-designated place (CDP) and unincorporated community in the township.
Crow Island is an unincorporated community in the township on Crow Island Road between M-13 and Hack Road. A post office opened February 6, 1882, and closed March 13, 1883. The office was reestablished May 3, 1883, until closing on March 15, 1895.
Fifield was a settlement with a railroad station on the Pere Marquette Railroad.  It was centered around a sawmill and had a post office from 1898 until 1900.
Robin Glen-Indiantown is a census-designated place (CDP) in the township containing the unincorporated community of Indiantown.

Geography

Demographics

2020 census

2000 Census
As of the census of 2000, there were 10,318 people, 3,870 households, and 2,743 families residing in the township. The racial makeup of the township was 37.00% White, 55.57% African American, 0.46% Native American, 0.13% Asian, 0.01% Pacific Islander, 4.30% from other races, and 2.53% from two or more races. Hispanic or Latino of any race were 9.11% of the population.

There were 3,870 households, out of which 35.1% had children under the age of 18 living with them, 39.2% were married couples living together, 27.2% had a female householder with no husband present, and 29.1% were non-families. 24.6% of all households were made up of individuals, and 8.6% had someone living alone who was 65 years of age or older.  The average household size was 2.61 and the average family size was 3.10.

In the township the population was spread out, with 30.3% under the age of 18, 8.7% from 18 to 24, 26.9% from 25 to 44, 21.8% from 45 to 64, and 12.3% who were 65 years of age or older.  The median age was 33 years. For every 100 females, there were 92.4 males.  For every 100 females age 18 and over, there were 84.8 males.

The median income for a household in the township was $30,339, and the median income for a family was $32,851. Males had a median income of $30,625 versus $22,775 for females. The per capita income for the township was $15,636.  About 19.7% of families and 20.4% of the population were below the poverty line, including 31.6% of those under age 18 and 11.4% of those age 65 or over.

Government
The township is governed under a modified Council–manager government where the township manager only takes over most of the duties of the supervisor.

References

Notes

Sources

External links
Charter Township of Buena Vista

Townships in Saginaw County, Michigan
Charter townships in Michigan